The Marqués de Riscal Hotel, also known as the Marqués de Riscal Vineyard Hotel, is a luxury hotel located in Elciego, Spain. It is part of The Luxury Collection. The hotel was designed by Frank Gehry using methods previously employed in the Guggenheim Museum Bilbao. It was built by Ferrovial.

References

Hotel buildings completed in 2006
Hotels in Spain
The Luxury Collection